Charles Daniels was a Black Canadian working as a porter supervisor with the CPR at the beginning of the 20th century. In 1914, he launched 
a $1,000 discrimination lawsuit against the Sherman Grand theatre in Calgary, Alberta, Canada, when the management refused to honour his ticket for floor seating in the whites-only section to see a production of King Lear.

Biography 
Charles Daniels is an early and rare example of a Black Canadian civil rights pioneer who came to the Canadian prairies as part of the poorly documented wave of African-American settlers to Alberta during the early 20th century. His date and place of birth and death are unknown, and unfortunately, "historical records have not preserved images of Charles Daniels, his wife, his son, or his close-knit group of friends." In 1914, Charles Daniels was known to be working for the CPR based out of Calgary as an inspector for porters and was part of a black union, the Brotherhood of the Sleeping Car Porters.Porters looked after the needs of railway passengers, and were one of the few jobs available to black men in Canada in the early 20th century. They were subject to racial injustice and slurs, for example, being called derogatory names like "George" or "boy," but they played an instrumental part in the birth of modern Canada. In 2019, writer Cecil Foster published the book They Called Me George: The Untold Story of Black Train Porters and the Birth of Modern Canada, a study of the history of Black Canadian train porters.{
  "type": "FeatureCollection",
  "features": [
    {
      "type": "Feature",
      "properties": {},
      "geometry": {
        "type": "Point",
        "coordinates": [
          -114.0648801326097,
          51.04725836870761
        ]
      }
    }
  ]
}Edmontonian amateur historian, Bashir Mohamed, rediscovered Charles Daniels' forgotten story through extensive archival research while researching Black history. In 2018, he first published his findings to his Twitter account, and then again in a larger piece in the independent Calgary publication, The Sprawl. His research revealed that Charles Daniels possessed a keen love of theatre. On February 3, 1914, Charles Daniels sent the neighbour's boy on an errand to purchase two tickets to see a production of King Lear playing at the Sherman Grand theatre; one for Charles Daniels and one for his friend his friend, Andrew Hill. When Daniels and Hill arrived at the show to claim their seats, the theatre refused to seat them, instead offering to exchange them for seats in the balcony. "Although Canada does not have a history of official laws that enforced segregation of Black and white Canadians, for years Black people have had to overcome unwritten policies of racial segregation at places like restaurants, parks, pools and local cinemas or theatres." Theatres would often reserve the best seating on the floor level for white patrons, while blacks were relegated to the less desirable balcony seating. 

Charles Daniels refused to change his tickets, but the theatre stood firm and denied him entry. Humiliated and embarrassed in front of fellow colleagues at the CPR who witnessed the altercation, Daniels hired a lawyer and launched a lawsuit with lawyer John McDonald for $1,000 in damages against the theatre, the building owner Senator James Lougheed, and William Sherman for discriminatory segregation practices. "In 1914, oppression and even violence against black people was common. Regardless, Daniels risked his safety and drew attention to himself by launching a public battle against Sherman Grand Theatre's manager and owner," Bashir Mohamed said in The Sprawl article. "Regarding the coloured people, our audience objects very much—and I like their money as well as anyone else’s, and it is not for that I object, but the audience complains." – William Sherman, proprietor of the Grand Theatre, in court documents explaining why Charles Daniels' ticket for floor seating was rejected. When the case came to trial, lawyers for the theatre failed to show up so Daniels won the court case by default, receiving approximately $20,000 in 2020 Canadian dollars although there is no record he received the money. Embarrassed by the reputation damage to the theatre, Senator James Lougheed, fired William Sherman shortly after, replacing him with another theatre magnate, although it is not known if the theatre rescinded its segregation practice.

Documentary 
With funding provided by StoryHive, a creative initiative by Telus, director Cheryl Foggo in collobaration with amateur Calgary historian Bashir Mohamed as associate producer, premiered a documentary in February 2020 called Secret Calgary: Kicking Up A Fuss which can be freely viewed on YouTube through StoryHive's channel.

Documentary Blurb 
In 1914, Charles Daniels entered a Calgary theatre with a paid ticket. He was denied his seat because he was Black. In this little-known civil rights story, Daniels reminds us that history is full of forgotten heroes.

Legacy 
As reported in an interview with the CBC in 2018, Bashir Mohamed said, "But here we have a Calgarian who, 104 years ago, decided to stand up — 50 years after the end of slavery and 50 years before the peak of the civil rights movements." In fact, better known Black Canadian civil rights activist Viola Desmond, whose portrait graces the Canadian $10 bill and also fought against theatre segregation, was born in 1914, the same year Charles Daniels fought his court case. Other historical Black Canadian figures fighting theatre segregation include Nova Scotian, Carrie M. Best, who in 1941 protested the removal of a group of black high school girls who were removed from the whites-only section of the Roseland Theatre, the same theatre Viola Desmond would be forcibly removed from five years later; and Lulu Anderson, who in 1922 was denied entry to see The Lion and the Mouse at the Metropolitan Theatre in Edmonton because of her race. Charles Daniels is unique amongst this group of people as the earliest known example of a Black Canadian fighting racial segregation in theatres and he is the only one to have won their lawsuit.

In 2019, the Alberta Media Arts Alliance Society created a Save a Seat for Viola campaign to help raise awareness about issues of equity and justice. The Central branch of The Calgary Public Library and Globe Theatres participated by reserving several seats throughout their theatres with the likeness of Viola Desmond to give theatre-goers a sense of the racist experience black people like Viola Desmond and Charles Daniels went through in their determination to fight the inequality of segregation. Information scholar, Miranda Fricker, calls their experience a form of epistemic injustice called hermeneutical injustice, where in this instance, the victim of racial segregation cannot comprehend why they are being mistreated and excluded. For Charles Daniels, he felt he deserved to keep his seat since he was “sober and well behaved" like anyone else in the whites-only section; he did not see the colour of his skin as a legitimate reason to move to another location.  

Daniel's case is important because although he won his lawsuit, systemic racism and inequality have continued up to the present day in Canada. In The Sprawl article, Bashir Mohamed said, "This is a legacy that most Albertans know little about. On reflection, I can understand why this ignorance exists. Our civil rights history is buried. Primary sources are difficult to find, and we a have a lack of images to showcase this history." Charles Daniels' recently recovered story helps further document the Black Canadian experience, an area that requires further research and scholarship. Cheryl Foggo, an author, playwright and filmmaker in Calgary, said it's important for their stories to be told.

"We, in Canada, have done a very poor job of sharing our Black history widely," she said.

"Black history is just history. It is a part of our history and yet it is not widely known."

References 

Canadian civil rights activists
Year of birth missing
Year of death missing
Black Canadian activists